Afterburner Inc. is an Atlanta, GA based business consulting firm founded in 1996 by U.S. Air Force fighter pilot James D. "Murph" Murphy.  Afterburner has ranked on the Inc 500/5000 List of America's Fastest Growing Companies five times. Afterburner's team of fighter pilots, United States Navy SEALS and other Special Operations professionals train organizations in the military-inspired continuous improvement methodology known as Flawless ExecutionSM. Afterburner has been featured in leading publications like The Wall Street Journal, Businessweek, Forbes, The New York Times, Financial Times, Newsweek, Slate, Sports Illustrated and Atlanta Business Chronicle. Afterburner also has appeared on CNN, ABC, CNBC, Fox News, HLN and Bloomberg News, among others.

Products
While Afterburner is well known for keynote engagements and experiential events featuring elite military personnel, Afterburner increasingly aids and advises Global 2000 businesses specifically in the area of execution of strategic "can’t fail" missions.

Clients
Afterburner brings elite military precision to top corporations around the world with a client list that includes over 85% percent of the U.S. Fortune 50 and Super Bowl champion New York Giants.

PublicationsFlawless Execution, James D. Murphy, Harper Collins, 2005Down Range, James D. Murphy & William M. Duke, John Wiley & Sons 2014Courage to Execute, James D. Murphy, John Wiley & Sons 2014The Debrief Imperative, James D. Murphy & William M. DukeBusiness is Combat'', James D. Murphy, Regan Books, 2000

References

External links
 Official website

Companies based in Atlanta
Consulting firms established in 1996
1996 establishments in Georgia (U.S. state)